"There's a Tear in My Beer" is a country song written and recorded by Hank Williams, and later re-recorded by his son in 1988.

Original version
The original version was written and recorded by Hank Williams during one of his Nashville sessions in 1950-51, but he decided against releasing it. It was not until many years later, in 1989, that the original song would get its first official release. The song was recorded by Bill Lister, who later gave the demo by Hank Williams to Hank's son.

1988 version
Hank Williams Jr.'s version is a duet with his father created using electronic merging technology. The original disc was transferred to audio tape by Alan Stoker at the Country Music Hall of Fame and Museum.  As the song had been previously recorded with Hank Williams playing the guitar as the sole instrument, his son and his band simply "filled in the blanks" and recorded additional vocals. The music video for the song combined television footage that had existed of Hank Williams performing, onto which  electronic merging technology impressed the recordings of Hank Jr., which then made it appear as if he were playing with his father. The video was both a critical and commercial success, and was named Video Of The Year by both the Country Music Association and the Academy of Country Music. Hank Williams, Sr. & Jr., would go on to "share" a Grammy award win in 1990 for Best Country Vocal Collaboration.

Music video
The music video was directed by Ethan Russell and produced by [Joanne Gardner/ACME Pictures] and premiered in early 1989. In the video, Hank Williams Jr. performs the song by himself in an old house on a stormy night. After the first chorus, he hears vocals and sees a silhouette coming from behind a door near him. After harmonizing for a couple of bars with the mystery singer, he opens the door to discover his father, Hank Williams Sr., playing the song with his band in footage of an old performance. Hank Jr. then walks through the door and magically appears by his father's side to finish the song together.  

The footage of Hank Sr. was a digitally modified kinescope of a 1952 performance of "Hey, Good Lookin'" on the Kate Smith Evening Hour. The editing team made several hundred minute tweaks to lay a new mouth (that of an actor dressed like Hank, Sr.) over the mouth of the original Hank. What now seems quaint was at the time quite groundbreaking. The New York Times did a feature on the video and its cutting edge visual effects, released around the time Forrest Gump used similar effects.

Chart performance

References

External links
 

1989 singles
Hank Williams Jr. songs
Hank Williams songs
Songs written by Hank Williams
Song recordings produced by Barry Beckett
Song recordings produced by Jim Ed Norman
Male vocal duets
Warner Records singles
Curb Records singles
1951 songs
Songs about alcohol
Songs released posthumously